This is a list of rulers and office-holders in the history of Myanmar.

Heads of state
 Monarchs
 Early and legendary monarchs
 Arakanese monarchs
 Prime ministers
 Presidents

Deputy heads of state
 Heirs apparent/presumptive
 Vice presidents

Heads of tributary states
 Rulers of Shan states
 Rulers of Ava
 Rulers of Martaban
 Rulers of Pegu
 Rulers of Prome
 Rulers of Toungoo

Colonial governors
 Colonial governors (British and Japanese)

See also
 List of Burmese consorts

Leaders
Lists of Asian rulers
Leaders